Back Street is a 1961 American Eastmancolor drama film directed by David Miller, and produced by Ross Hunter. The screenplay was written by William Ludwig and Eleanore Griffin based on the 1931 novel of the same name by Fannie Hurst. The music score is by Frank Skinner, who also scored the 1941 version. The film stars Susan Hayward, John Gavin, and Vera Miles.

The story follows two lovers who have limited opportunities to get together because one of them is married.

Hedda Hopper claims Hunter was considering Gregory Peck and William Holden for the lead until she suggested John Gavin.

It was nominated for an Oscar for Best Costume Design, Color (Jean Louis). Unlike the previous film versions, this one gives Susan Hayward plenty of opportunity to appear in Jean Louis's spectacular gowns. This was a trademark of Ross Hunter's remakes of older "weepies"; he employed the same method in Lana Turner's versions of Imitation of Life and Madame X.

Of all three screen versions of Back Street, this 1961 production took the most dramatic license with the novel. It is different from both the 1932 and 1941 screen versions in many ways – changing the names of several characters and updating the story to what was then the present day. Good examples of how the plotline was sensationalized in this third version are the attempted suicide and the fatal car crash.

Plot
Wealthy department-store heir Paul Saxon has a romantic fling with a Nebraska dress-shop owner, Rae Smith, who breaks it off when she discovers he is married.

Rae moves to New York to become a fashion designer, then on to Rome to become the famed Dalian's partner in a salon. Paul continues to woo her, explaining that his alcoholic wife Liz won't grant him a divorce and is unstable, having tried to commit suicide.

Her resistance lowered, Rae becomes the lover of Paul, meeting secretly with him at a house near Paris that he buys. Paul's son learns of the affair and demands that Rae stop seeing his father. Liz makes a public scene humiliating Rae at a charity fashion show featuring her designs, purchasing the closing creation, a wedding gown, for $10,000.

As a drunken Liz leaves the house to attend a party, Paul confronts her.  He gets into the car with her, and as the two argue they fight over the keys in the ignition.  The car crashes instantly killing Liz and leaving Paul critically paralyzed in the hospital.  Paul dies from his injuries, but not before insisting his son call Rae so he can tell her he loves her.  Rae, Paul Jr. and his sister Caroline are left alone with their grief.

The last scene shows her sitting by the window of the home he bought for her.  She was looking at his picture and a knock came on the door.  It was Paul's son with his little sister and the movie ended with Rae with her arms around them.

Cast
 Susan Hayward as Rae Smith
 John Gavin as Paul Saxon 
 Vera Miles as Liz Saxon 
 Charles Drake as Curt Stanton 
 Virginia Grey as Janie 
 Reginald Gardiner as Dalian 
 Tammy Marihugh as Caroline 
 Robert Eyer as Paul Saxon Jr. 
 Natalie Schafer as Mrs. Evans 
 Doreen McLean as Miss Hatfield 
 Alex Gerry as Mr. Venner 
 Karen Norris as Mrs. Penworth 
 Hayden Rorke as Charley Claypole 
 Mary Lawrence as Marge Claypole

Production
Filming started 21 September 1960.

Reception

Critical response
Film critic Bosley Crowther wrote in his review: "Producer Ross Hunter has crammed so much swank and so much plush Parisian elegance that we wonder he didn't change the title to something like 'Rue du Bac.' Never has Miss Hurst's little lady (represented heretofore by Irene Dunne and Margaret Sullavan, vis-à-vis the respective consorts of John Boles and Charles Boyer) been set up in such elaborate diggings or lavished with such expensive gifts as is Susan Hayward by John Gavin in this elaborate and expensive color film."

Variety said it was "strictly for the women".

Release
Back Street released on DVD on May 29, 2014.

See also
 List of American films of 1961

References

External links
 
 
 

1961 films
American romantic drama films
1960s English-language films
Films based on American novels
1961 romantic drama films
Remakes of American films
Universal Pictures films
Adultery in films
Films directed by David Miller
Films with screenplays by William Ludwig
Films produced by Ross Hunter
Films set in the 1940s
Films set in the 1950s
Films about fashion in the United States
Films scored by Frank Skinner
Films based on works by Fannie Hurst
1960s American films